Nilar Lwin is a Burmese politician who currently serves as a Sagaing Region Hluttaw member of parliament for Myinmu Township No. 2 Constituency. She is a member of the National League for Democracy.

In the Myanmar general election, 2015, she was elected as a Sagaing Region Hluttaw MP, winning a majority of 21093 votes and elected representative from Myinmu Township No. 2 parliamentary constituency. She is serving as a chairwoman of Sagaing Region Hluttaw Legislative Affairs Committee.

References

National League for Democracy politicians
Living people
People from Sagaing Region
Year of birth missing (living people)